Andrue John Anstett (born June 25, 1946) is a former politician in Manitoba, Canada.  He served in the New Democratic Party government of Premier Howard Pawley, and made an unsuccessful bid for the party's leadership in 1988.

Anstett was born in Groningen in the Netherlands, and moved to Kitchener, Ontario as an infant.  He received an honours political science degree from the University of Waterloo and did post-graduate studies in Canadian parliamentary procedure and election administration.  He moved to Manitoba in 1973 upon his appointment as deputy clerk of the Legislative Assembly and deputy chief electoral officer for the province. He held these positions until resigning in 1979.

Anstett was elected to the provincial legislature in the 1981 provincial election, as a candidate of the New Democratic Party in the rural riding of Springfield.  He was appointed Minister of Municipal Affairs on November 4, 1983, and also served as Government House Leader.  When Howard Pawley introduced a constitutional amendment to address a court decision respecting French language rights in the 1980s, Anstett was a leading supporter of the measure.  As Government House Leader, he was the minister responsible for the constitutional amendment, which was the subject of rancorous debate throughout the province. Most observers cite Anstett's leadership role in the unpopular constitutional amendment as the reason for his defeat by 55 votes by Progressive Conservative Gilles Roch in the election of 1986.
 
When the Pawley government lost a parliamentary vote of confidence in 1988, Anstett ran to succeed Pawley as leader.  He placed third on the first ballot with 317 votes (out of 1,663 valid votes cast), and was eliminated on the second ballot despite the support of fourth-place candidate Maureen Hemphill.  The NDP government was defeated in the election which followed, and was reduced to third party status.  Anstett contested Springfield in this election, and finished third.

After his career in provincial politics ended, Anstett became chair of the Manitoba Municipal Board, and later served as chair of the Ontario Assessment Review Board until 1998. From 1998 to 2005, he was Vice President of Corporate Affairs for AEC-International in Toronto and through the International Property Tax Institute, United States Agency for International Development (USAID), the Lincoln Institute on Land Policy, the World Bank and the United Nations Development Programme, he advised governments in the developing world and in countries in transition in Eastern Europe on property assessment and tax policy. He was a property tax advisor to the government of Kyrgyzstan in 2002, and to the government of Macedonia in 2003/04. In 2005, he became director of legislation and policy support services with the Municipal Property Assessment Corporation in Ontario and subsequently served as senior policy and issues advisor in their president's office.

See also
 List of University of Waterloo people

References

1946 births
Living people
Politicians from Groningen (city)
New Democratic Party of Manitoba MLAs
University of Waterloo alumni
Dutch emigrants to Canada
Canadian management consultants